Charles Krauth may refer to:

 Charles Philip Krauth (1797–1867), Lutheran clergyman
 Charles Porterfield Krauth (1823–1883), Lutheran pastor, theologian and educator